Pedro Vega (1560–1616) was a Roman Catholic prelate who served as Bishop of Cartagena (1615–1616).

Biography
Pedro Vega was born in Bubierca, Spain on 3 Nov 1560.
On 6 Oct 1614, he was appointed during the papacy of Pope Paul V as Bishop of Cartagena.
In 1615, he was consecrated bishop.
He served as Bishop of Cartagena until his death on 17 Jun 1616.

References

External links and additional sources
 (for Chronology of Bishops) 
 (for Chronology of Bishops) 

17th-century Roman Catholic bishops in New Granada
Bishops appointed by Pope Paul V
Roman Catholic bishops of Cartagena in Colombia
1560 births
1616 deaths